Nike Women's Advertising is Nike advertisements towards women.

Although Nike started aggressively advertising towards women in the 1990s, they were not the first athletic company to promote their products towards women. According to Shelly Lucas's article, "Nike's Commercial Solution: Girls, Sneakers, and Salvation", "In 1981, Reebok, one of Nike's competitors in the athletic shoe industry, chose to make women its primary target market." Because aerobics became popular among women, Reebok pursued that opportunity and advertised towards women. Nike executives, however, did not view aerobics as a sport, and as a result, they did not immediately take advantage of the opportunity.

Eventually, Reebok's strategic move to advertise towards women proved to be a success showing a 13% rise in market share, while Nike's market share was declining by 28%. Prior to 1987, there were no Nike advertisements directed toward women because it was believed that it would compromise Nike’s authentic and serious sports image. Finally in 1987, Nike slowly changed course with more women in its advertisements, but it was not really until the 1990s that it ramped up its focus on the woman as an athlete to compete with Reebok. Initially, ads in 1987 were too aggressive and they did not appeal to women. With that said, many people considered the 1987 ads to be a failure. Three years later, Nike advertised in a different way this time creating ads that target women’s emotions and giving them a feeling of sense of community. According to Shelly Lucas, Nike created a team of "...about 40 female employees from various Nike and Wieden & Kennedy (Nike's advertising agency) departments and let the team work together on new women’s campaign." The team of women eventually created advertising campaigns that revolved around three "big ideas": empowerment, entitlement, and product emphasis, which became influential to women throughout the nation according to Jean Grow and Joyce Wolburg.

References

Further reading

External links
 Nike Puts Women Front and Center for 40 Years and Counting

Nike Inc. advertising